Battle of Wenden or Battle of Cēsis may refer to
Battle of Cēsis (1210)
Battles of Wenden (1577–1578)
Battle of Wenden (1601)
Battle of Wenden (1626)
Battle of Wenden II (1626)
Battle of Cēsis (1919)